Dastjan (also Romanized as Dastjān and Dastejān; also known as Dostkānd) is a village in Farmahin Rural District, in the Central District of Farahan County, Markazi Province, Iran. At the 2006 census, its population was 1,263, in 365 families.

References 

Populated places in Farahan County